"Una finestra tra le stelle" is a song by Italian singer Annalisa. It was written by Kekko Silvestre by Modà, and produced by Enrico Palmosi.

It was released by Warner Music Italy on 11 February 2015 as the third single from her studio album Splende. The song was Annalisa's entry for the Sanremo Music Festival 2015, where it placed fourth in the grand final. "Una finestra tra le stelle" peaked at number 14 on the FIMI Singles Chart and was certified platinum in Italy.

Music video
A music video to accompany the release of "Una finestra tra le stelle" was then released onto YouTube on 11 February 2015. The video was directed by Gaetano Morbioli and shot inside Villa Mosconi Bertani in Negrar di Valpolicella, Veneto.

Track listing

Charts

Certifications

References

2015 singles
2015 songs
Annalisa songs
Sanremo Music Festival songs